Perrottetinene is a naturally occurring cannabinoid compound found in liverworts from the genus Radula native to Japan, New Zealand and Costa Rica, namely Radula perrottetii, Radula marginata and Radula laxiramea, along with a number of similar compounds. Its chemical structure closely resembles that of THC, the main active component of marijuana but with a cis rather than trans conformation. The absolute configuration of perrottetinene was established in 2008 by an enantioselective total synthesis. In 2018, a study showed that perrottetinene is moderately psychoactive through activation of the cannabinoid receptor 1. The same study also reported reduced prostaglandin D2 and E2 brain concentrations in mice after perrottetinene administration.

References 

Cannabinoids
Benzochromenes
Phenols